Aporrectodea is a genus of earthworms in the family Lumbricidae. The genus includes some of the most common earthworms in the Palearctic realm and in agricultural soils across the temperate regions of the world.

Several species are found throughout the world today, having been widely introduced via agriculture. One of these widespread species, A. trapezoides, was also transported across continents as a popular fishing bait.

Some species of this genus are known to be important in the process of soil formation.

Among the most familiar species is Aporrectodea caliginosa, which has been known as a species complex made up of several very similar taxa whose relationships were not clear. A phylogenetic analysis confirmed that these taxa are separate species, including A. trapezoides, A. tuberculata, A. longa, and A. nocturna.

Species
Species include:

Aporrectodea alavanensis
Aporrectodea alba
Aporrectodea anamariae
Aporrectodea andorranensis
Aporrectodea annula
Aporrectodea aragonensis
Aporrectodea ariadne
Aporrectodea arverna
Aporrectodea atlantica
Aporrectodea balisa
Aporrectodea bohiniana
Aporrectodea borellii
Aporrectodea bulgarica
Aporrectodea burgosana
Aporrectodea byanensis
Aporrectodea caliginosa
Aporrectodea catalaunensis
Aporrectodea cemernicensis
Aporrectodea chitae
Aporrectodea cuendeti
Aporrectodea cupulifera
Aporrectodea cyanea
Aporrectodea diazi
Aporrectodea dinarica
Aporrectodea dubiosa
Aporrectodea edwardsi
Aporrectodea eurytanica
Aporrectodea eurytrichos
Aporrectodea faeculentes
Aporrectodea georgii
Aporrectodea gogna
Aporrectodea graffi
Aporrectodea haymozi
Aporrectodea haymoziformis
Aporrectodea hongae
Aporrectodea hrabei
Aporrectodea iberica
Aporrectodea icterica
Aporrectodea jassyensis
Aporrectodea jenensis
Aporrectodea joffrei
Aporrectodea kioniona
Aporrectodea kozjekensis
Aporrectodea lanzai
Aporrectodea ligra
Aporrectodea limicola
Aporrectodea longa
Aporrectodea lopezi
Aporrectodea macvensis
Aporrectodea mediterranea
Aporrectodea micella
Aporrectodea microcoprodomas
Aporrectodea microendogea
Aporrectodea molleri
Aporrectodea monticola
Aporrectodea morenoe
Aporrectodea mrsici
Aporrectodea multitheca
Aporrectodea navarrensis
Aporrectodea opisthopora
Aporrectodea opisthosellata
Aporrectodea pannoniella
Aporrectodea papukiana
Aporrectodea predalpina
Aporrectodea pseudoantipai
Aporrectodea pseudoeiseni
Aporrectodea pulvinus
Aporrectodea retropuberta
Aporrectodea riparia
Aporrectodea rosea
Aporrectodea rubicunda
Aporrectodea sardonica
Aporrectodea smaragdina
Aporrectodea smaragdinoides
Aporrectodea subterrestris
Aporrectodea terrestris
Aporrectodea thaleri
Aporrectodea tiginosa
Aporrectodea vasconensis
Aporrectodea velox
Aporrectodea zhongi
Aporrectodea zicsii

References

Lumbricidae